Halit Shamata (born 28 August 1954 in Kavajë) is an Albanian author and politician who formerly served as Albania's Minister of Interior and later Deputy Minister of Education.

Political career
 Deputy Minister of Education and Science (2005–2013)
 Interior Minister (1996–1997)
 Member of the Albanian Parliament (1992–1997)

Books
 Viti i brishtë, roman, 2009
 Punë Dore, poezi, 2006. 
 Dy dorëshkrime, roman, 2004. 
 Dyer të paputhitura, roman, 2001. 
 99 paradokse, poezi, 1999. 
 Moshë e pakohë, poezi, 1997.
 Tatuazh, poezi, 1995
 Autograf, poezi, 1990.

References

Cabinet ministers from Kavajë
Parliament members from Kavajë
1954 births
Living people
Members of the Parliament of Albania
Government ministers of Albania
Interior ministers of Albania
20th-century Albanian politicians
Albanian male poets
Male novelists
Albanian novelists
20th-century Albanian poets
20th-century novelists
20th-century male writers
21st-century Albanian poets
21st-century novelists
21st-century male writers